The Dindigul Corporation is a civic body that governs Dindigul city, India. This corporation consist of 48 wards and the legislative body is headed by an elected Chairperson assisted by a Deputy Chairperson and 48 councillors who represent each wards in the city. Government of Tamil Nadu announced for upgrade of Dindigul Special Grade Municipality to City Municipal Corporation of Dindigul.

On 19 February 2014, Chief Minister of Tamil Nadu, J. Jayalalithaa declared that Dindigul Municipality has been upgraded to Corporation status with immediate effect. The said government order was handed over to the Municipal Chairman, V. Marudharaj

History
In 1866 Nov 1, Dindigul town became municipality. In 1988 Jan 14, Dindigul municipality became a special grade municipal.

References 

Dindigul
Municipal corporations in Tamil Nadu
2014 establishments in Tamil Nadu
Dindigul district